Michael Harding (born 1953) is an Irish writer.

Biography
Harding was born and raised in Cavan, Ireland. He went to St. Patrick's College, Maynooth, initially graduating as a lay graduate. He then taught for two years in St. Patrick's College in Cavan Town, then worked as a social worker in a prison. He returned to Maynooth as a seminarian and was ordained in 1980, after which he went to work in a parish in Fermanagh. He left the priesthood in 1985, then spent seventeen years practising Buddhism.

He is married to the sculptor Cathy Carman (whom he first met in 1984) and they have a daughter Sophia and a son, Simon. He lives in Tarmon, County Leitrim.

Work
He is an active writer of novels and poetry. He is a regular columnist with The Irish Times. He was Writer in Association with The Abbey Theatre in 1993 and was Writer in Residence at Trinity College Dublin, in 1999.

Publications

Novels
 Priest (1986)
 The Trouble With Sarah Gullion (1988)
 Bird in the Snow (2008)

Plays
 Strawboys, Peacock Abbey Theatre, 1987
 Una Pooka, Peacock Abbey Theatre, 1989
 Misogynist, Abbey Theatre, 1990
 Burying Brian Boru, Theatre Omnibus, 1990
 Where the Heart is, Project Arts Centre, 1993
 Hubert Murray's Widow, Peacock Abbey Theatre, 1993
 The Kiss, Project Arts Centre, 1994
 Ceacht Houdini, Amharclann de hIde, 1994
 Backsides to the Wind, Red Kettle, 1995
 Sour Grapes, Peacock Abbey Theatre, 1997
 Amazing Grace, Peacock Abbey Theatre, 1998
 Bog Dances, Steve Wickham and Shake the Spear Theatre @ Dunamaise Arts Centre, 2000
 Sleeping a Lovesong, Project Arts Centre, 2002
 Talking Through His Hat, Dublin Fringe Festival @ The Focus, 2002
 Swallow, Gare St Lazare Players @ Dublin Fringe Festival, 2003
 Birdie Birdie, for Blue Raincoat Theatre, 2004
 Tearmann for Siamsa Tire, The National Folk Theatre of Ireland, 2006
 The Tinker's Curse, Livin' Dred Theatre Company, 2007.
 Is There Balm in Gilead? Pavilion Theatre Dublin, 2007

Other
 Staring at Lakes (winner of the Bord Gais Energy Book of the Year Award 
 Hanging with the Elephant
 Talking with Strangers
 On Tuesdays I'm a Buddhist (2017)
 Chest Pain, A man, a stent and camper van (2019)

Awards
 1989 - short listed for the Irish Times Aer Lingus Literature Award
 1990 - Stewart Parker Trust Award for Theatre
 1990 - Bank of Ireland RTÉ award for excellence in the arts
 1980 - Hennessy Literary Award for short stories
 2004 - Best Actor, Dublin Fringe Festival for his performance in Gare St Lazare's production of Swallow.
 2006 - Nominated Best Actor in a Supporting Role – British Theatre Management Awards
 2007 - The Tinker's Curse, nominated for Best New Play at the Irish Times Irish Theatre Awards
 2013 - Staring at Lakes, Non-Fiction Book of the Year Irish Book Awards
 2000 - Member, Aosdána, Irish National Academy for Creative Artists

References

1953 births
Aosdána members
Living people
20th-century Irish dramatists and playwrights
Irish male dramatists and playwrights
Irish novelists
Alumni of St Patrick's College, Maynooth
Place of birth missing (living people)
Laicized Roman Catholic priests
Irish male novelists
People from County Cavan
21st-century Irish dramatists and playwrights
20th-century Irish male writers
21st-century Irish male writers